County Cork has a number of rail-trails and greenways and, as of 2022, there are plans and proposals at various stages of preparation to create a network of walking trails for the county. The term "Cork Greenway" has been used in press coverage, but is not yet used officially.

Midleton — Youghal rail trail
 
In July 2015, Irish Rail indicated they had no intention of re-opening the Midleton to Youghal section of the Cork and Youghal Railway as funds would be better spent on the existing network. They indicated support for a greenway, as it would free them from existing maintenance costs whilst retaining a license to re-open the route in the event that became an option. By April 2020, a €15 million euro project to open the Midleton to Youghal Greenway had begun but was being delayed by the COVID-19 pandemic. The proposed trail would measure 23 kilometres.

Mallow — Fermoy — Dungarvan
In 2022, the possibility of linking Mallow to the existing Waterford Greenway and Suir blueway was examined.

Cork Harbour Greenway

The Cork Harbour Greenway runs from Páirc Uí Chaoimh stadium to Passage West, along the route of the former Cork Electric Tramways and Lighting Company Blackpool — Cork tram line, and Cork, Blackrock and Passage Railway.

References

External links
 Greenways page at Cork County Council website

Irish Greenways
Transport in County Cork
Rail trails in the Republic of Ireland